Francis Coulton, known as Frank Coulton was born in the third quarter of 1866 and passed away in 1929. He was an English footballer who played in the Football League for Aston Villa.

Frank Coulton first signed for Walsall Swifts F.C. in 1884 and left for Aston Villa in 1886.

Season 1888-89

Described as a stylish full back, he was a key member of the Aston Villa League defence in the inaugural season of 1888-89 which only conceded 43 goals, the third lowest. He played in the opening match on 8 September 1888 at Dudley Road, Wolverhampton, the then home of Wolverhampton Wanderers. The match finished 1–1. Coulton played at full-back. Coulton only missed three League games and one FA Cup tie over the season as Aston Villa finished as runners-up. As a full-back he played in a defence that achieved one League clean-sheet and kept the opposition to one-League-goal-in-a-match on no less than on nine occasions.

Statistics
Source:

References

1862 births
1929 deaths
Sportspeople from Walsall
Association football defenders
English footballers
Walsall F.C. players
Aston Villa F.C. players
English Football League players
FA Cup Final players